The 1966 VFL season was the 70th season of the Victorian Football League (VFL), the highest level senior Australian rules football competition in Victoria. The season featured twelve clubs, ran from 23 April until 24 September, and comprised an 18-game home-and-away season followed by a finals series featuring the top four clubs.

The premiership was won by the St Kilda Football Club, after it defeated  by one point in the VFL Grand Final. It was St Kilda's first premiership, making it the last of the eight foundation clubs to win a premiership.

Premiership season
In 1966, the VFL competition consisted of twelve teams of 18 on-the-field players each, plus two substitute players, known as the 19th man and the 20th man. A player could be substituted for any reason; however, once substituted, a player could not return to the field of play under any circumstances.

Teams played each other in a home-and-away season of 18 rounds; matches 12 to 18 were the "home-and-way reverse" of matches 1 to 7.

Once the 18 round home-and-away season had finished, the 1966 VFL Premiers were determined by the specific format and conventions of the Page–McIntyre system.

Round 1

|- bgcolor="#CCCCFF"
| Home team
| Home team score
| Away team
| Away team score
| Venue
| Crowd
| Date
|- bgcolor="#FFFFFF"
| 
| 11.6 (72)
| 
| 9.4 (58)
| Windy Hill
| 31,560
| 23 April 1966
|- bgcolor="#FFFFFF"
| 
| 17.13 (115)
| 
| 9.8 (62)
| Victoria Park
| 32,741
| 23 April 1966
|- bgcolor="#FFFFFF"
| 
| 16.19 (115)
| 
| 9.8 (62)
| Lake Oval
| 22,376
| 23 April 1966
|- bgcolor="#FFFFFF"
| 
| 4.9 (33)
| 
| 17.7 (109)
| MCG
| 64,934
| 25 April 1966
|- bgcolor="#FFFFFF"
| 
| 11.9 (75)
| 
| 13.9 (87)
| Western Oval
| 23,252
| 25 April 1966
|- bgcolor="#FFFFFF"
| 
| 14.16 (100)
| 
| 16.10 (106)
| Princes Park
| 43,695
| 25 April 1966

Round 2

|- bgcolor="#CCCCFF"
| Home team
| Home team score
| Away team
| Away team score
| Venue
| Crowd
| Date
|- bgcolor="#FFFFFF"
| 
| 7.14 (56)
| 
| 3.11 (29)
| Glenferrie Oval
| 14,000
| 30 April 1966
|- bgcolor="#FFFFFF"
| 
| 13.16 (94)
| 
| 11.8 (74)
| Kardinia Park
| 21,490
| 30 April 1966
|- bgcolor="#FFFFFF"
| 
| 17.15 (117)
| 
| 5.17 (47)
| MCG
| 28,596
| 30 April 1966
|- bgcolor="#FFFFFF"
| 
| 5.13 (43)
| 
| 12.20 (92)
| Arden Street Oval
| 19,813
| 30 April 1966
|- bgcolor="#FFFFFF"
| 
| 5.12 (42)
| 
| 9.17 (71)
| Brunswick Street Oval
| 20,362
| 30 April 1966
|- bgcolor="#FFFFFF"
| 
| 15.17 (107)
| 
| 7.12 (54)
| Moorabbin Oval
| 30,810
| 30 April 1966

Round 3

|- bgcolor="#CCCCFF"
| Home team
| Home team score
| Away team
| Away team score
| Venue
| Crowd
| Date
|- bgcolor="#FFFFFF"
| 
| 9.13 (67)
| 
| 15.13 (103)
| Arden Street Oval
| 17,261
| 7 May 1966
|- bgcolor="#FFFFFF"
| 
| 18.15 (123)
| 
| 11.14 (80)
| MCG
| 32,608
| 7 May 1966
|- bgcolor="#FFFFFF"
| 
| 14.22 (106)
| 
| 7.15 (57)
| Lake Oval
| 17,259
| 7 May 1966
|- bgcolor="#FFFFFF"
| 
| 12.14 (86)
| 
| 7.4 (46)
| Kardinia Park
| 17,395
| 7 May 1966
|- bgcolor="#FFFFFF"
| 
| 8.18 (66)
| 
| 8.6 (54)
| Windy Hill
| 43,487
| 7 May 1966
|- bgcolor="#FFFFFF"
| 
| 6.8 (44)
| 
| 10.16 (76)
| Brunswick Street Oval
| 16,714
| 7 May 1966

Round 4

|- bgcolor="#CCCCFF"
| Home team
| Home team score
| Away team
| Away team score
| Venue
| Crowd
| Date
|- bgcolor="#FFFFFF"
| 
| 12.17 (89)
| 
| 17.17 (119)
| MCG
| 31,497
| 14 May 1966
|- bgcolor="#FFFFFF"
| 
| 9.13 (67)
| 
| 14.15 (99)
| Glenferrie Oval
| 10,873
| 14 May 1966
|- bgcolor="#FFFFFF"
| 
| 12.13 (85)
| 
| 5.18 (48)
| Victoria Park
| 40,272
| 14 May 1966
|- bgcolor="#FFFFFF"
| 
| 15.12 (102)
| 
| 5.11 (41)
| Princes Park
| 31,819
| 14 May 1966
|- bgcolor="#FFFFFF"
| 
| 15.11 (101)
| 
| 7.16 (58)
| Moorabbin Oval
| 37,140
| 14 May 1966
|- bgcolor="#FFFFFF"
| 
| 12.12 (84)
| 
| 5.16 (46)
| Western Oval
| 14,672
| 14 May 1966

Round 5

|- bgcolor="#CCCCFF"
| Home team
| Home team score
| Away team
| Away team score
| Venue
| Crowd
| Date
|- bgcolor="#FFFFFF"
| 
| 12.8 (80)
| 
| 15.8 (98)
| Kardinia Park
| 21,655
| 21 May 1966
|- bgcolor="#FFFFFF"
| 
| 10.10 (70)
| 
| 4.10 (34)
| Western Oval
| 12,424
| 21 May 1966
|- bgcolor="#FFFFFF"
| 
| 7.11 (53)
| 
| 13.17 (95)
| Lake Oval
| 33,255
| 21 May 1966
|- bgcolor="#FFFFFF"
| 
| 9.10 (64)
| 
| 17.11 (113)
| Brunswick Street Oval
| 15,279
| 21 May 1966
|- bgcolor="#FFFFFF"
| 
| 7.4 (46)
| 
| 11.15 (81)
| Arden Street Oval
| 21,293
| 21 May 1966
|- bgcolor="#FFFFFF"
| 
| 3.14 (32)
| 
| 11.13 (79)
| MCG
| 35,955
| 21 May 1966

Round 6

|- bgcolor="#CCCCFF"
| Home team
| Home team score
| Away team
| Away team score
| Venue
| Crowd
| Date
|- bgcolor="#FFFFFF"
| 
| 12.16 (88)
| 
| 9.9 (63)
| MCG
| 45,254
| 28 May 1966
|- bgcolor="#FFFFFF"
| 
| 15.15 (105)
| 
| 12.9 (81)
| Windy Hill
| 15,400
| 28 May 1966
|- bgcolor="#FFFFFF"
| 
| 12.18 (90)
| 
| 8.9 (57)
| Victoria Park
| 26,153
| 28 May 1966
|- bgcolor="#FFFFFF"
| 
| 11.13 (79)
| 
| 6.10 (46)
| Princes Park
| 23,598
| 28 May 1966
|- bgcolor="#FFFFFF"
| 
| 8.7 (55)
| 
| 12.20 (92)
| Arden Street Oval
| 15,290
| 28 May 1966
|- bgcolor="#FFFFFF"
| 
| 17.16 (118)
| 
| 8.6 (54)
| Moorabbin Oval
| 19,737
| 28 May 1966

Round 7

|- bgcolor="#CCCCFF"
| Home team
| Home team score
| Away team
| Away team score
| Venue
| Crowd
| Date
|- bgcolor="#FFFFFF"
| 
| 11.12 (78)
| 
| 15.12 (102)
| Glenferrie Oval
| 18,755
| 4 June 1966
|- bgcolor="#FFFFFF"
| 
| 12.6 (78)
| 
| 15.12 (102)
| Brunswick Street Oval
| 14,338
| 4 June 1966
|- bgcolor="#FFFFFF"
| 
| 17.16 (118)
| 
| 15.16 (106)
| Lake Oval
| 15,800
| 4 June 1966
|- bgcolor="#FFFFFF"
| 
| 14.10 (94)
| 
| 9.6 (60)
| MCG
| 38,498
| 4 June 1966
|- bgcolor="#FFFFFF"
| 
| 6.12 (48)
| 
| 8.20 (68)
| Western Oval
| 23,721
| 4 June 1966
|- bgcolor="#FFFFFF"
| 
| 8.9 (57)
| 
| 8.8 (56)
| Kardinia Park
| 25,398
| 4 June 1966

Round 8

|- bgcolor="#CCCCFF"
| Home team
| Home team score
| Away team
| Away team score
| Venue
| Crowd
| Date
|- bgcolor="#FFFFFF"
| 
| 11.5 (71)
| 
| 7.8 (50)
| Western Oval
| 15,983
| 11 June 1966
|- bgcolor="#FFFFFF"
| 
| 14.21 (105)
| 
| 11.10 (76)
| Victoria Park
| 37,034
| 11 June 1966
|- bgcolor="#FFFFFF"
| 
| 7.15 (57)
| 
| 8.6 (54)
| Princes Park
| 26,510
| 11 June 1966
|- bgcolor="#FFFFFF"
| 
| 8.13 (61)
| 
| 11.14 (80)
| Brunswick Street Oval
| 12,987
| 13 June 1966
|- bgcolor="#FFFFFF"
| 
| 10.11 (71)
| 
| 8.23 (71)
| MCG
| 33,959
| 13 June 1966
|- bgcolor="#FFFFFF"
| 
| 8.8 (56)
| 
| 7.7 (49)
| Moorabbin Oval
| 50,548
| 13 June 1966

Round 9

|- bgcolor="#CCCCFF"
| Home team
| Home team score
| Away team
| Away team score
| Venue
| Crowd
| Date
|- bgcolor="#FFFFFF"
| 
| 16.13 (109)
| 
| 11.8 (74)
| MCG
| 55,426
| 18 June 1966
|- bgcolor="#FFFFFF"
| 
| 9.17 (71)
| 
| 4.13 (37)
| Windy Hill
| 18,600
| 18 June 1966
|- bgcolor="#FFFFFF"
| 
| 9.11 (65)
| 
| 4.12 (36)
| Arden Street Oval
| 8,957
| 18 June 1966
|- bgcolor="#FFFFFF"
| 
| 20.24 (144)
| 
| 5.1 (31)
| Kardinia Park
| 13,550
| 18 June 1966
|- bgcolor="#FFFFFF"
| 
| 11.7 (73)
| 
| 13.20 (98)
| Lake Oval
| 25,100
| 18 June 1966
|- bgcolor="#FFFFFF"
| 
| 9.13 (67)
| 
| 9.9 (63)
| Glenferrie Oval
| 19,500
| 18 June 1966

Round 10

|- bgcolor="#CCCCFF"
| Home team
| Home team score
| Away team
| Away team score
| Venue
| Crowd
| Date
|- bgcolor="#FFFFFF"
| 
| 17.15 (117)
| 
| 8.9 (57)
| Kardinia Park
| 13,941
| 25 June 1966
|- bgcolor="#FFFFFF"
| 
| 8.19 (67)
| 
| 8.7 (55)
| Western Oval
| 11,733
| 25 June 1966
|- bgcolor="#FFFFFF"
| 
| 14.16 (100)
| 
| 15.6 (96)
| Windy Hill
| 20,600
| 25 June 1966
|- bgcolor="#FFFFFF"
| 
| 17.15 (117)
| 
| 6.9 (45)
| Victoria Park
| 37,607
| 25 June 1966
|- bgcolor="#FFFFFF"
| 
| 11.17 (83)
| 
| 3.7 (25)
| MCG
| 14,688
| 25 June 1966
|- bgcolor="#FFFFFF"
| 
| 8.17 (65)
| 
| 6.6 (42)
| Arden Street Oval
| 10,573
| 25 June 1966

Round 11

|- bgcolor="#CCCCFF"
| Home team
| Home team score
| Away team
| Away team score
| Venue
| Crowd
| Date
|- bgcolor="#FFFFFF"
| 
| 10.7 (67)
| 
| 22.8 (140)
| Brunswick Street Oval
| 9,351
| 2 July 1966
|- bgcolor="#FFFFFF"
| 
| 9.21 (75)
| 
| 13.15 (93)
| MCG
| 39,217
| 2 July 1966
|- bgcolor="#FFFFFF"
| 
| 15.15 (105)
| 
| 7.12 (54)
| Moorabbin Oval
| 21,507
| 2 July 1966
|- bgcolor="#FFFFFF"
| 
| 6.13 (49)
| 
| 11.13 (79)
| Glenferrie Oval
| 15,880
| 9 July 1966
|- bgcolor="#FFFFFF"
| 
| 7.11 (53)
| 
| 6.6 (42)
| Princes Park
| 29,240
| 9 July 1966
|- bgcolor="#FFFFFF"
| 
| 12.10 (82)
| 
| 13.12 (90)
| Lake Oval
| 22,750
| 9 July 1966

Round 12

|- bgcolor="#CCCCFF"
| Home team
| Home team score
| Away team
| Away team score
| Venue
| Crowd
| Date
|- bgcolor="#FFFFFF"
| 
| 8.5 (53)
| 
| 10.15 (75)
| Brunswick Street Oval
| 6,936
| 16 July 1966
|- bgcolor="#FFFFFF"
| 
| 12.13 (85)
| 
| 6.6 (42)
| Moorabbin Oval
| 15,003
| 16 July 1966
|- bgcolor="#FFFFFF"
| 
| 10.15 (75)
| 
| 6.6 (42)
| Arden Street Oval
| 8,114
| 16 July 1966
|- bgcolor="#FFFFFF"
| 
| 15.7 (97)
| 
| 5.7 (37)
| Kardinia Park
| 23,114
| 16 July 1966
|- bgcolor="#FFFFFF"
| 
| 5.7 (37)
| 
| 16.14 (110)
| Glenferrie Oval
| 13,990
| 16 July 1966
|- bgcolor="#FFFFFF"
| 
| 8.13 (61)
| 
| 4.6 (30)
| MCG
| 38,094
| 16 July 1966

Round 13

|- bgcolor="#CCCCFF"
| Home team
| Home team score
| Away team
| Away team score
| Venue
| Crowd
| Date
|- bgcolor="#FFFFFF"
| 
| 7.15 (57)
| 
| 11.16 (82)
| Western Oval
| 16,573
| 23 July 1966
|- bgcolor="#FFFFFF"
| 
| 6.16 (52)
| 
| 6.6 (42)
| Windy Hill
| 19,400
| 23 July 1966
|- bgcolor="#FFFFFF"
| 
| 19.14 (128)
| 
| 9.7 (61)
| Victoria Park
| 18,094
| 23 July 1966
|- bgcolor="#FFFFFF"
| 
| 7.15 (57)
| 
| 5.11 (41)
| Princes Park
| 33,367
| 23 July 1966
|- bgcolor="#FFFFFF"
| 
| 23.13 (151)
| 
| 9.5 (59)
| MCG
| 18,254
| 23 July 1966
|- bgcolor="#FFFFFF"
| 
| 9.11 (65)
| 
| 9.17 (71)
| Lake Oval
| 20,100
| 23 July 1966

Round 14

|- bgcolor="#CCCCFF"
| Home team
| Home team score
| Away team
| Away team score
| Venue
| Crowd
| Date
|- bgcolor="#FFFFFF"
| 
| 10.12 (72)
| 
| 14.13 (97)
| MCG
| 35,460
| 30 July 1966
|- bgcolor="#FFFFFF"
| 
| 10.16 (76)
| 
| 14.17 (101)
| Glenferrie Oval
| 12,237
| 30 July 1966
|- bgcolor="#FFFFFF"
| 
| 7.9 (51)
| 
| 10.11 (71)
| Western Oval
| 16,951
| 30 July 1966
|- bgcolor="#FFFFFF"
| 
| 7.10 (52)
| 
| 18.9 (117)
| Victoria Park
| 38,918
| 30 July 1966
|- bgcolor="#FFFFFF"
| 
| 12.15 (87)
| 
| 9.6 (60)
| Princes Park
| 15,203
| 30 July 1966
|- bgcolor="#FFFFFF"
| 
| 10.18 (78)
| 
| 4.16 (40)
| Moorabbin Oval
| 30,530
| 30 July 1966

Round 15

|- bgcolor="#CCCCFF"
| Home team
| Home team score
| Away team
| Away team score
| Venue
| Crowd
| Date
|- bgcolor="#FFFFFF"
| 
| 14.11 (95)
| 
| 10.12 (72)
| Kardinia Park
| 28,729
| 6 August 1966
|- bgcolor="#FFFFFF"
| 
| 13.17 (95)
| 
| 13.11 (89)
| Brunswick Street Oval
| 8,795
| 6 August 1966
|- bgcolor="#FFFFFF"
| 
| 18.17 (125)
| 
| 15.19 (109)
| Lake Oval
| 14,200
| 6 August 1966
|- bgcolor="#FFFFFF"
| 
| 11.16 (82)
| 
| 12.11 (83)
| Arden Street Oval
| 5,835
| 6 August 1966
|- bgcolor="#FFFFFF"
| 
| 13.8 (86)
| 
| 16.9 (105)
| MCG
| 73,834
| 6 August 1966
|- bgcolor="#FFFFFF"
| 
| 18.7 (115)
| 
| 10.13 (73)
| Windy Hill
| 28,000
| 6 August 1966

Round 16

|- bgcolor="#CCCCFF"
| Home team
| Home team score
| Away team
| Away team score
| Venue
| Crowd
| Date
|- bgcolor="#FFFFFF"
| 
| 19.19 (133)
| 
| 10.6 (66)
| Moorabbin Oval
| 20,083
| 13 August 1966
|- bgcolor="#FFFFFF"
| 
| 14.9 (93)
| 
| 6.9 (45)
| Windy Hill
| 14,600
| 13 August 1966
|- bgcolor="#FFFFFF"
| 
| 12.21 (93)
| 
| 6.8 (44)
| Victoria Park
| 19,900
| 13 August 1966
|- bgcolor="#FFFFFF"
| 
| 14.15 (99)
| 
| 10.10 (70)
| Princes Park
| 13,127
| 13 August 1966
|- bgcolor="#FFFFFF"
| 
| 6.12 (48)
| 
| 11.16 (82)
| MCG
| 54,976
| 13 August 1966
|- bgcolor="#FFFFFF"
| 
| 18.11 (119)
| 
| 9.13 (67)
| Glenferrie Oval
| 8,429
| 13 August 1966

Round 17

|- bgcolor="#CCCCFF"
| Home team
| Home team score
| Away team
| Away team score
| Venue
| Crowd
| Date
|- bgcolor="#FFFFFF"
| 
| 17.16 (118)
| 
| 11.13 (79)
| Kardinia Park
| 19,654
| 20 August 1966
|- bgcolor="#FFFFFF"
| 
| 5.10 (40)
| 
| 17.22 (124)
| Brunswick Street Oval
| 12,165
| 20 August 1966
|- bgcolor="#FFFFFF"
| 
| 10.11 (71)
| 
| 10.12 (72)
| Lake Oval
| 20,200
| 20 August 1966
|- bgcolor="#FFFFFF"
| 
| 11.13 (79)
| 
| 15.10 (100)
| Glenferrie Oval
| 21,520
| 20 August 1966
|- bgcolor="#FFFFFF"
| 
| 12.12 (84)
| 
| 21.15 (141)
| MCG
| 46,319
| 20 August 1966
|- bgcolor="#FFFFFF"
| 
| 4.1 (25)
| 
| 12.14 (86)
| Western Oval
| 14,516
| 20 August 1966

Round 18

|- bgcolor="#CCCCFF"
| Home team
| Home team score
| Away team
| Away team score
| Venue
| Crowd
| Date
|- bgcolor="#FFFFFF"
| 
| 12.16 (88)
| 
| 11.5 (71)
| Arden Street Oval
| 10,419
| 27 August 1966
|- bgcolor="#FFFFFF"
| 
| 11.18 (84)
| 
| 7.7 (49)
| Windy Hill
| 22,200
| 27 August 1966
|- bgcolor="#FFFFFF"
| 
| 18.24 (132)
| 
| 3.10 (28)
| Victoria Park
| 20,324
| 27 August 1966
|- bgcolor="#FFFFFF"
| 
| 5.10 (40)
| 
| 16.14 (110)
| Princes Park
| 37,236
| 27 August 1966
|- bgcolor="#FFFFFF"
| 
| 14.9 (93)
| 
| 13.5 (83)
| Moorabbin Oval
| 23,860
| 27 August 1966
|- bgcolor="#FFFFFF"
| 
| 20.23 (143)
| 
| 11.10 (76)
| MCG
| 18,980
| 27 August 1966

Ladder

Night Series Competition
The night series were held under the floodlights at Lake Oval, South Melbourne, for the teams (5th to 12th on ladder) out of the finals at the end of the season.

Final: North Melbourne 20.12 (132) defeated Hawthorn 12.7 (79).

Premiership Finals

First Semi-Final

Second Semi-Final

Preliminary Final

Grand Final

Awards
 The 1966 VFL Premiership team was St. Kilda (its first, and to date, only premiership since the VFL's formation in 1897).
 The VFL's leading goalkicker was Ted Fordham of Essendon who kicked 76 goals (including 3 goals in the final series).
 The winner of the 1966 Brownlow Medal was Ian Stewart of St Kilda with 21 votes.
 Fitzroy took the "wooden spoon" in 1966.
Richmond 14.11 (95) defeated  13.12 (90) in the Grand Final, held as a curtain-raiser to the seniors Grand Final at the Melbourne Cricket Ground on 24 September.

Notable events
 At pre-season training in mid-April, at the behest of Collingwood coach Bob Rose, Collingwood club secretary Jack Burns informed Duncan Wright that his services were no longer required at Collingwood. (See Duncan Wright and John Somerville.)
 Richmond, under coach Tom Hafey, trained pre-season with Percy Cerutty at his facilities in Portsea, Victoria.
The rule was trialled again, with the area expanded to a 50yd square, during the Night Series, and it was eventually introduced as a permanent rule change in 1973.
 In Round 17, Fitzroy hosted its last senior VFL match at the Brunswick Street Oval, its home ground since 1883. A total of 612 VFL matches were played at the venue, including four finals games. Fitzroy began its nomadic journey of playing at various grounds over the next thirty years following its departure from Brunswick Street: Princes Park (twice), Junction Oval, Victoria Park, and Western (Whitten) Oval. 
 After the home-and-away season was finished, 's reserves and under-19s teams were stripped of any premiership points earned in matches in which they fielded Frank Loughran, an unregistered player from the Latrobe Valley. The reserves team, which went through the entire season undefeated, was stripped of twelve premiership points; it fell from first to second on the ladder, but still went on to win the premiership. The under-19s team was stripped of 28 premiership points, and dropped out of the final four as a result.
 At the end of the season South Melbourne's captain-coach, Bob Skilton, resigned as coach in the belief that he could do more for the club by continuing to lead the players on the field.

See also
 1966 VFL Grand Final

References

 Hogan, P., The Tigers of Old, The Richmond Football Club, (Richmond), 1996. 
 Maplestone, M., Flying Higher: History of the Essendon Football Club 1872–1996, Essendon Football Club, (Melbourne), 1996. 
 Rogers, S. & Brown, A., Every Game Ever Played: VFL/AFL Results 1897–1997 (Sixth Edition), Viking Books, (Ringwood), 1998. 
 Ross, J. (ed), 100 Years of Australian Football 1897–1996: The Complete Story of the AFL, All the Big Stories, All the Great Pictures, All the Champions, Every AFL Season Reported, Viking, (Ringwood), 1996. 
 Strevens, S., Bob Rose: A Dignified Life, Allen & Unwin, (Crows Nest), 2004.

External links
 1966 Season – AFL Tables

Australian Football League seasons
VFL season